Nikolay Hristozov (born 6 March 1982) is a Bulgarian retired footballer who played as a defender and is currently manager of Vitosha Bistritsa.

Career 
Hristozov was raised in CSKA Sofia's youth teams.  On 19-years old signed with Lokomotiv Sofia, but for three seasons played in only 8 matches.  In June 2004, he joined the ranks of Conegliano and one year later became joint champions of second division in Bulgarian football with the team. Between 2006 and 2008, he played in top division of Bulgarian football with Vihren. In May 2008, he signed with Lokomotiv Mezdra.

On 12 June 2018, Hristozov was appointed as assistant manager of Vitosha Bistritsa.

On 25 May 2021, he was announced as the new manager of Vitosha Bistritsa, who will lead the team in Third League.

References

1982 births
Living people
People from Dimitrovgrad, Bulgaria
Bulgarian footballers
First Professional Football League (Bulgaria) players
Second Professional Football League (Bulgaria) players
FC Lokomotiv 1929 Sofia players
OFC Vihren Sandanski players
PFC Lokomotiv Mezdra players
PFC Minyor Pernik players
PFC Dobrudzha Dobrich players
FC Vitosha Bistritsa players
Association football defenders
Sportspeople from Haskovo Province